The Type 72Z tank (also known as the T-72Z and the Safir-74, and the Al-Zubair I in Sudan) is a highly modernized version of the Type 59 and T-54/T-55 tanks, with upgrades carried out by the Iranian Defense Industries Organization.

The tank is not to be confused with an Iraqi modernization also known as T-72Z, said to carry a 125 mm gun.

History

The Type 72Z was first announced by the Islamic Revolutionary Guard Corps in 1996. The upgrades to the Type 59 and T-54/T-55 tanks were carried out by the Vehicle Industries Group of the Defence Industries Organization, in order to extend the service life of tanks already in use with the Iranian army.

Upgrades
The 100mm gun of the T-55/Type 59 was replaced with an Iranian-produced derivative of the 105mm M68 gun, capable of firing 9M117 Bastion anti-tank guided missiles as well as NATO standard ammunition. The Slovenian Fotona Electronic Fire Control System (EFCS-3-55) was added, with automatic and manual gun stabilizers, a laser rangefinder, second-generation night sights, a ballistic computer, and an independent viewer and target designation system for the commander. Electric smoke grenade dischargers were also added to provide concealment on top of the existing ability to create a smoke screen by injecting diesel fuel into the left exhaust outlet.

Explosive reactive armor (ERA) developed by the Shahid Kolah Dooz Industrial Complex can be fitted to the Type 72Z, providing protection against projectiles and napalm-type weapons. Side track skirts similar to those on the Type 59 were added to T-54/T-55 tanks upgraded with ERA. 

The engine was replaced with a Ukrainian 780 hp V46-6 diesel engine, together with the SPAT-1200 transmission system. Air conditioning, power steering and a fire suppression system are also believed to have been installed.

Variants
 Safir-74 - Iranian T-54/T-55 tanks which have gone through similar upgrades. Safir means "messenger" in Persian.
 Al-Zubair I - Sudanese variant of the Type 72Z manufactured by the Military Industry Corporation, with the engine upgraded with a supercharger.

Operators 

 
 Ground Forces of the Islamic Revolutionary Guard Corps
 Islamic Republic of Iran Army Ground Forces
 : First purchased in 2006.

Non-state operators

  Kata'ib Hezbollah

See also
 Zulfiqar MBT
 Karrar MBT

References

Main battle tanks of Iran
Post–Cold War main battle tanks
Iran–Soviet Union relations
Military vehicles introduced in the 1990s